Peter Pöllhuber (born 30 April 1985) is an Austrian professional association football player, currently playing for Wiener Viktoria as a defender. He is the twin brother of SC Rheindorf Altach defender Alexander Pöllhuber.

References

1985 births
Living people
Austrian twins
Austrian footballers
Association football defenders
SC Austria Lustenau players
Twin sportspeople